Kantroy Barber (born October 4, 1973) is a former running back in the National Football League (NFL) for the New England Patriots, Carolina Panthers, and Miami Dolphins. He was drafted in the 4th round with the 124th overall pick in the 1996 NFL Draft out of West Virginia.He attended Miami Carol City Senior High.

External links
https://web.archive.org/web/20111123100137/http://databasefootball.com/players/playerpage.htm?ilkid=BARBEKAN01

1973 births
Living people
West Virginia Mountaineers football players
American football running backs
Miami Dolphins players
Carolina Panthers players
New England Patriots players
Players of American football from Miami